SKYGLOW is an ongoing crowdfunded project exploring light pollution and its impact on cities, as well as North America's endangered dark-sky locations. It is produced by photographers/filmmakers Gavin Heffernan and Harun Mehmedinović, in association with the International Dark-Sky Association.

The Kickstarter fundraising campaign generated significant publicity and ended on May 9, 2015 as the fourth most successful project in the Photobooks category.

SKYGLOW was featured on Season 6 of the Discovery Science show Outrageous Acts of Science.

On December 5, 2015, Heffernan and Mehmedinović gave a sold out talk about SKYGLOW at The Annenberg Space for Photography in Los Angeles, and previewed photos and video from their journeys.

SKYGLOW photography and videos has been featured in numerous media outlets and popular culture, including a performance of The Rolling Stones' song Moonlight Mile during their Zip Code Tour in 2015, Roger Waters at Desert Trip Indio, Cosmic Gate's music video for their single am2pm in 2016, BBC Earth, and the U.S. National Park Service as part of their official centennial celebration video.

References

External links 
 Official website

+